"Ladytron" is a song by Bryan Ferry, recorded by his band Roxy Music and appearing on their eponymous debut album. The British electronic band Ladytron took their name from this song.

The song has distinctive instrumentation, including an oboe solo, liberal use of the mellotron's famous "three violins" tape set, and much processing of the other instruments by Brian Eno via his VCS3 synthesizer and tape echo. The sound in the start of the song was created by Brian Eno, after Bryan Ferry asked him to produce something reminiscent of the Lunar Landing.

Lyrically, it presents Ferry as a Casanova-style seducer of women, whilst being simultaneously enraptured by them. Another interpretation is that the Ladytron is a female robot (hence the name), being seduced by Ferry.

In 2006, The Times described "Ladytron" as one of Roxy Music's "best loved songs."

The haunting oboe melody heard in the intro is reminiscent of a passage in the first movement of Sergei Prokofiev's Piano Concerto No. 3 in C, Op. 26.

Personnel
 Bryan Ferry – Hohner Pianet electric piano, Mellotron, vocals
 Andy MacKay – oboe,  saxophone
 Brian Eno – VCS3 synthesiser, tape effects
 Graham Simpson – bass guitar
 Paul Thompson – drums
 Phil Manzanera – electric guitar

Notes

Roxy Music songs
Songs written by Bryan Ferry
1972 songs